Paul Allix (17 November 1888 – 27 November 1960) was a French classical organist and composer.

Biography 
Born in Paris, Paul Allix studied music at the Institut National des Jeunes Aveugles being himself blind. He worked the organ and music composition with Adolphe Marty and the piano with Maurice Blazy (1873–1933). In 1909 he was appointed organist of the great organ of the  where he invited several organists, including André Marchal in 1919. There he taught the piano. He died in Cherbourg-Octeville at the age of 72,

Works 
Paul Allix composed several pieces for piano, religious motets and some organ pieces:
 Cor Jesu: motet
 Sonate pascale (on the sequence Victimae paschali): sonata for organ.
 Esquisses, five little pieces for piano
 Enfantillages, six pieces for piano, annotated and fingered by Blanche Selva
 Pages anciennes, eight pieces for piano, annotated and fingered by Blanche Selva
 Berceuse et ronde, for piano
 Au soir, for piano

References

External links 
 Composers Classical Music Catalogue of compositions.
 Paul Allix on AbeBooks
 YouTube Communion, Stephen Mann at St Patrick's R.C. Church, Collyhurst, Manchester. UK

20th-century French composers
French composers of sacred music
French classical organists
French male organists
Blind classical musicians
French blind people
French choral conductors
French male conductors (music)
1888 births
Musicians from Paris
1974 deaths
20th-century organists
20th-century French conductors (music)
20th-century French male musicians
Male classical organists